The men's 5000 metres event at the 2011 Summer Universiade was held on 19–21 August.

Medalists

Results

Heats
Qualification: First 5 in each heat (Q) and the next 5 fastest (q) qualified for the final.

Final

References
Heats results
Final results

5000
2011